Dr. Jaiprakash Shankarlal Mundada is a member of the 13th Maharashtra Legislative Assembly. He represents the Basmath Assembly Constituency in Marathwada, Maharashtra. He belongs to the Shiv Sena (SS).

Career
Mundada is a Medical Doctor MBBS. He was Basmath taluka chief of Shiv Sena in 1987. He was elected to the state assembly from Basmath in 1990. He was textile minister, rehabilitation and minister of cooperatives in the Shiv Sena lead government (1995–99).

Controversy
An inmate of a hostel whose president was Mumdada died of hunger in October, 2008.

Positions held
 1990: Elected to Maharashtra Legislative Assembly (1st term)
 1995: Re-elected to Maharashtra Legislative Assembly (2nd term)
 1995-99: Cabinet Minister of Co-operation and Textiles in Government Of Maharashtra
 1999: Re-elected to Maharashtra Legislative Assembly (3rd term)
 2014: Re-elected to Maharashtra Legislative Assembly (4th term)

See also

  Panditrao Ramrao Deshmukh
 Manohar Joshi ministry
 Narayan Rane

References

External links
 Shivsena Home Page
 वसमत नगराध्यक्षपदी शिवसेनेचे सुनील काळे

Living people
Maharashtra MLAs 2014–2019
Shiv Sena politicians
Maharashtra MLAs 1990–1995
Maharashtra MLAs 1995–1999
People from Hingoli district
Maharashtra MLAs 1999–2004
Marathi politicians
Year of birth missing (living people)